Wagonmaster is the fifty-third and final studio album by American country music artist Porter Wagoner, who died on October 28, 2007. It was released on June 5, 2007, via the ANTI- Records label. A music video was made for the album's only single, "Committed to Parkview."

Track listing
All tracks composed by Porter Wagoner; except where indicated
 "Wagonmaster, Pt. 1" (Marty Stuart) – 0:48
 "Be a Little Quieter"  – 2:25
 "Who Knows Right from Wrong" (Pearl Butler) – 3:17
 "Albert Erving"  – 4:18
 "A Place to Hang My Hat" (Shawn Camp, Byron Hill, Brice Long) – 3:24
 "Eleven Cent Cotton" (Wagoner, Marty Stuart) – 2:39
 "My Many Hurried Southern Trips" (Dolly Parton, Wagoner) – 3:19
 "Committed to Parkview" (Johnny Cash) – 3:40
 "The Agony of Waiting" – 3:36
 "Buck and the Boys" (Marty Stuart) – 0:52
 "Fool Like Me" – 2:51
 "Late Love of Mine" – 3:11
 "Hotwired" (Shawn Camp, Mark Sanders) – 3:35
 "Brother Harold Dee" – 4:23
 "Satan's River" – 3:21
 "Wagonmaster, Pt. 2" (Marty Stuart) – 1:08
 Porter & Marty: "Men with Broken Hearts" / "(I Heard That) Lonesome Whistle" (Jimmie Davis / Hank Williams) – 6:04

Personnel
 Jim DeMain – Mastering 
 Stuart Duncan – Acoustic Guitar, Fiddle 
 Eric Fritsch – Piano, Hammond Organ 
 Brian Glenn – Upright Bass
 Carl Jackson – Background Vocals  
 Mike Johnson – Pedal Steel 
 Gordon Mote – Piano 
 Scott Munn – Executive Producer 
 Fred Newell – Pedal Steel 
 Maria Elena Orbean -Production Coordination 
 Adam Smith – Photography 
 Harry Stinson – Drums 
 Marty Stuart – Acoustic & Electric Guitar, Background Vocals, Poetry, Producer, Photography 
 Buck Trent – Banjo, Electric Banjo 
 Joey Turner – Engineer, Overdubs, Mixing 
 Kenny Vaughan – Acoustic & Electric Guitar, Archguitar 
 Porter Wagoner – Author, Vocals
 Stoker White – Assistant

Chart performance

References

External links
 Porter Wagoner's Official Website
 Record Label
 

2007 albums
Albums produced by Marty Stuart
Porter Wagoner albums
Anti- (record label) albums